Gymnosagena campiglossina is a species of tephritid or fruit flies in the genus Gymnosagena of the family Tephritidae.

Distribution
Madagascar.

References

Tephritinae
Insects described in 2006
Diptera of Africa